Pseudothyretes rubicundula is a moth of the  subfamily Arctiinae. It was described by Strand in 1912. It is found in Angola, Cameroon, the Democratic Republic of Congo, Equatorial Guinea, Ghana, Guinea, Kenya and Uganda.

References

Moths described in 1912
Syntomini
Moths of Africa